Tobi Kahn (born 1952) is an American painter and sculptor. Kahn lives and works in New York City and is on the faculty at the School of Visual Arts.

Life and career

Tobi Kahn was born in the Washington Heights neighborhood of New York City. He received a B.A. from Hunter College in 1976 and a MFA from Pratt Institute in 1978 in painting and sculpture.

Kahn co-founded and facilitates the Artists' Beit Midrash at the Streicker Center of Temple Emanu-El in Manhattan. Kahn frequently lectures on the importance of visual language and the art of healing.

Kahn is the artist-in-residence at Kivunim New Directions, New York.

Among the awards Kahn has received are the Outstanding Alumni Achievement Award from Pratt Institute in 2000; the Cultural Achievement Award for the Visual Arts from the National Foundation of Jewish Culture in 2004; and an honorary doctorate from the Jewish Theological Seminary in 2007 for his work as an artist and educator.

Kahn is married to writer Nessa Rapoport.

Work 
Kahn's early works draw on the tradition of American visionary landscape painting, and his more recent pieces reflect his fascination with contemporary science, inspired by the micro-images of cell formations and satellite photography. Kahn's work has been featured in over 70 solo exhibitions including at the Butler Institute of American Art, Fort Wayne Museum of Art, Museum of Fine Arts, Houston, the Neuberger Museum of Art,  The Philadelphia Museum of Jewish Art, the Weatherspoon Art Museum, and most recently at the Museum of Art - DeLand.

Kahn also creates ceremonial objects (Judaica). A practice which began as a private one, creating objects for his family, he began to include his ritual art in exhibitions in the late 1990s. Kahn's work "blur[s] the lines between spiritual and secular, between fine art and decorative object."

Kahn's creative practice also includes the creation of sacred spaces including a nondenominational contemplative space, an installation to reflect on the tenth anniversary of September 11, and specifically Jewish spaces as well as ceremonial and liturgical art.

Before the early 1990s, Kahn was known mainly for his painting. In 1993, he received his first commission for a large-scale sculpture. "SHALEV" was commissed by Jane Owen and the Robert Lee Blaffer Trust for New Harmony, Indiana.

Exhibitions and public commissions 

The solo exhibition, Tobi Kahn: Aura- New Paintings From Nature will be on view at Museum of Art - DeLand June 3 - August 5, 2018.

In 2017, Anointed Time:  Sculpture and Ceremonial Objects by Tobi Kahn was on view at The Butler Institute of American Art, Youngstown, OH. This exhibition involved Kahn's work from the early 1980s to 2017 and was first time his shrines, sculpture, and ceremonial art were all on view together.

Kahn had paintings included in the group show, Golem, at the Jewish Museum Berlin September 23, 2016 to January 29, 2017.

In 2015, Reverie: Tobi Kahn, a solo show of current work opened at the Cornell Museum of Rollins College, Winter Park, FL. In that same year Meridian: Paintings and Ceremonial Art of Tobi Kahn was on view at the Fort Wayne Museum of Art, Indiana.

In 2012, IMMANCE: The Art of Tobi Kahn, a solo exhibition of paintings from 1987-2012 opened at the Philadelphia Museum of Jewish Art, Philadelphia, PA. Another exhibition, RIFA-Sky and Water Installation, ran concurrently in Philadelphia at the National Museum of American Jewish History and had an accompanying catalogue.

In November 2011, ALIGNED, Paintings by Tobi Kahn, a solo exhibition of paintings curated by John Shipman, opened at the University of Maryland Art Gallery with an accompanying catalogue.

In September 2011, Embodied Light: 9-11 in 2011, an installation was commissioned by the Educational Alliance of New York in commemoration of the tenth anniversary of 9/11 and exhibited in the Ernest Rubenstein Gallery at the Education Alliance. An associated catalogue was published with essays by Maya Benton, Norman L. Kleeblatt, James E. Young and meditations by Nessa Rapoport. This exhibition traveled to the Islip Art Museum in 2012.

Rendering the Unthinkable: Artists Respond to 9/11 a group exhibition described as "a selection of works from 13 New York artists deeply affected by 9/11" and was on view at the National September 11 Memorial & Museum September 2016- January 2018 an included an installation by Kahn titled M'AHL. The other artists involved were Blue Man Group, Gustavo Bonevardi, Monika Bravo, Eric Fischl, Donna Levinstone, Michael Mulhern, Colleen Mulrenan Macfarlane, Christopher Saucedo, Manju Shandler, Doug and Mike Starn, Todd Stone, and Ejay Weiss. 

In October 2009 Tobi Kahn: Sacred Spaces for the 21st Century, a solo traveling exhibition of ceremonial and liturgical art, opened at the Museum of Biblical Art (MOBIA) in NYC. A catalogue of the same title, edited by Ena Giurescu Heller and published by the Museum of Biblical Art in New York in association with D Giles Limited, London, accompanied the exhibition. The publication includes essays by Jeff Edwards, Heller, Kahn, David Morgan, Klaus Ottmann, and Daniel Sperber, with meditations by Nessa Rapoport.

In 2008 Kahn was commissioned to create eight wall-scale paintings and ritual objects, including the eternal light, mezuzah, and panels for the ark doors, for the sanctuary of Congregation Emanu-El B'ne Jeshurun, Milwaukee, WI.

The 2003 exhibition Tobi Kahn: Sky and Water at The Neuberger Museum of Art, Purchase College, was a monumental installation of 106 paintings. The accompanying catalogue includes essays by Dede Young, who curated the exhibition, and by Donald Kuspit.

In 2002, The HealthCare Chaplaincy of New York commissioned Kahn to create a nondenominational meditative space. The resulted in "EMET," built to the artist's specifications to house nine sky-and-water murals and a set of sculptural furniture also created by Kahn.

Landscape at the Millennium: Installations by Tobi Kahn and Pat Steir; Nineteenth-Century Paintings from the Parrish Art Museum and the Albright-Knox Art Gallery was on view at the Albright-Knox Art Gallery November 20, 1999- Sunday, January 2, 2000.

The ten year survey exhibition, "Tobi Kahn: Metamorphoses", curated by Peter Selz with an accompanying catalogue including essays by Peter Selz, Dore Ashton and Michael Brenson traveled to 8 museum across the country from 1997-1999. Art in America included "Metamorphoses" in its national museum preview list.

In 1999, the solo exhibition, "AVODAH: Objects of the Spirit" opened in New York at Hebrew Union College and traveled to over 20 venues over a 9-year period throughout the United States. An accompanying book, "Objects of the Spirit: Ritual and the Art of Tobi Kahn" was published by Hudson Hills Press and the Avodah Institute, edited by Emily Bilski.

Kahn created the set design for the 1990 Elizabeth Swados production of "Jonah" at the Public Theater in New York. That same year, he also conceived and created the set for Muna Tseng's "Ways, Shrines, Mysteries" at Florence Gould Hall in New York.

Kahn was selected as one of nine artists to be included in the 1985 New Horizons in American Art exhibition at the Solomon R. Guggenheim Museum.

Kahn's work has also been exhibited at the Jerusalem Biennale, the Museum of Biblical Art (Dallas), the Museum of Contemporary Religious Art in St Louis, the Evansville Museum and in the Museum of Biblical Art (MOBIA) in New York.

Collections
Kahn's work is represented in the follow public collections:
Albright-Knox Art Gallery, Buffalo, NY
Brauer Museum of Art, Valparaiso, IN 
Butler Institute of American Art, Youngstown, OH
Colby College Museum of Art, Waterville, ME
Cornell Museum, Winter Park, FL
Edwin A. Ulrich Museum of Art, Wichita, KS
Fort Wayne Museum, Fort Wayne, IN
Houston Museum of Fine Arts, Houston, TX
The Jewish Museum, New York, NY
Minneapolis Institute of Art, Minneapolis, MN
Museum of Art Fort Lauderdale, FL
Neuberger Museum of Art, Purchase, NY
Pennsylvania Academy of the Fine Arts, Philadelphia, PA
Phillips Collection, Washington, DC
Rose Art Museum, Brandis University, Waltham, MA
Skirball Cultural Center, Los Angeles, CA
Solomon R. Guggenheim Museum, New York, NY
Weatherspoon Art Museum, University of North Carolina, Greensboro
Yale University Art Gallery, New Haven, CT

Selected bibliography 

 Ann Berman, Connoisseur's World, Town and Country, June 1994 
 Elizabeth Fazzare, "7 Chapels Designed by Artists Including James Turrell, Louise Nevelson, and Mark Rothko," Architectural Digest, April 3, 2018. 
 Samuel G. Freedman, “Art Intended to Make the End of Life Beautiful,” The New York Times, December 21, 2010 (illustration).
 Benjamin Genocchio, “Nature’s Majesty,” The New York Times, Connecticut Edition, Sunday, August 3, 2003. 
 Susan Kleinman, "ARTS IN AMERICA; Blending Modern Art With Objects of the Spirit", The New York Times, April 26, 2000.  
 Margaret Moorman, "Spaces for the Spirit," ARTnews, Summer 2001.  
 David Van Biema,  "Tobi Kahn’s soulful art is for Jews — and non-Jews too", Religious News Service, April 25, 2016.

References

External links 
Official website
Tobi Kahn, PBS video, July 25, 2013

Living people
American artists
1952 births
Jewish American artists
21st-century American Jews